Wali is an Indonesian Malay Pop band formed in Ciputat, South Tangerang, Indonesia in 1999. The band comprises vocalist Faank, guitarist Apoy, drummer Tomy and keyboardist Ovie. The band has been billed as part of the "local creative pop" scene which incorporates the use of Malay pop rhythms in their songs.

Wali are known for their hit singles, such as "Cari Jodoh", "Dik", "Si Udin Bertanya" and "Baik Baik Sayang". The first album titled Orang Bilang (People Say), released in 2008.

Discography

References

External links 
 Official site

Musical groups established in 1999
Indonesian pop music groups
1999 establishments in Indonesia